Otolo is a town in Nnewi North, Anambra State, Nigeria. Otolo is the premier quarter in Nnewi among the four quarters of Nnewi town. Others are Umudim, Uruagu and Nnewichi.This is true in terms of population, seat of political power and, apparently even, concentration of wealth. Otolo is ruled by a monarchy, the Nwosu family which is a part of a larger nwakanwa family has ruled Otolo for centuries. The current traditional ruler Chief Chukwuemeka Ofili Nwosu is the son of the late chief A.B.C Nwosu, former lawyer and general in the now deposed Biafran army. Chief Ofili Nwosu has three children with his first wife Chief Mrs Ebele Nwosu. Next in line to the throne of Otolo is the first son of Chief Ofili Nwosu and heir apparent to the throne, Prince Nwosu Chukwudumebi obidimma, Princess Adanna Nwosu who is the first daughter of Chief Ofili and also the ADA of Otolo, Prince Chukwukamso Nwosu who is the last child of the three children. The Nwosu family is a very large and dense family which is also part of the even larger Nwakanwa family which is also part of an even larger Obiuno family.

In addition, Chukwuemeka Ofili Nwosu(The prime minister of Nnewi) passed on the 9th October, 2019 and was buried this year. The heir to the throne he left has not been announced.

Gallery

References

Populated places in Anambra State
Nnewi